Tuna Williard Scanlan (12 July 1934 – 21 October 2014) was a Samoan-born New Zealand professional middle/light heavyweight boxer of the 1950s and 1960s.

Scanlan was born in Apia, Samoa. He won the New Zealand Boxing Association middleweight title, and the British Commonwealth middleweight title, and was a challenger for the Australasian middleweight title against Clive Stewart.

In 2014, Scanlan died in Ranfurly Hospital and Veterans Home, Mount Roskill, and was buried in Waikumete Cemetery.

References

External links

1934 births
2014 deaths
Burials at Waikumete Cemetery
Light-heavyweight boxers
Middleweight boxers
New Zealand professional boxing champions
People from Tuamasaga
Samoan male boxers
New Zealand male boxers
Samoan emigrants to New Zealand
Sportspeople from Apia